This is a list of terrorist incidents conducted by violent non-state actors, i.e. excluding state terrorism.

Attacks 1950 to 1999

1971
McGurk's Bar bombing
Location: Belfast, Northern Ireland
Killed: 15 (17 injured)
Perpetrator: Ulster Volunteer Force (UVF)

1972
Munich massacre
Location: Munich, West Germany
Killed: 17 (including 5 perpetrators)
Perpetrator: Black September Organization

1974
Birmingham pub bombings
Location: The Mulberry Bush and Tavern in the Town, Birmingham, England
Killed: 21 (182 injuries)
Perpetrator: Provisional Irish Republican Army (PIRA)

Dublin and Monaghan bombings
Location: Dublin, Ireland
Monaghan, Ireland
Killed: 34 (300 injuries)
Perpetrator: Ulster Volunteer Force (UVF)

1977
Tenerife Airport Disaster
Location: Las Palmas, Gran Canaria, Spain
Killed: 0 (The chain of events caused by the bombing caused 583 people to die at a nearby airport when two planes collided on the runway where they had been diverted, not from the bombing itself)
Perpetrator: Canary Islands Independence Movement (CIIM)

1978
Cinema Rex fire
Location: Adaban, Iran
Killed: 470+ Injured 200+ doused theater in airplane fuel and locked 700 movie goers inside as they lit fire to the theater burning it down.
Perpetrator: Group of 4 men

1980
Bologna massacre
Location: Bologna Centrale railway station, Italy
Killed: 85
Perpetrator: Nuclei Armati Rivoluzionari (NAR, Armed Revolutionary Nuclei)

1985
Air India Flight 182 bombing
Location: Atlantic Ocean
Killed: 329
Perpetrator: Babbar Khalsa

Rome and Vienna airport attacks
Location: Leonardo da Vinci Airport and Vienna International Airport
Killed: 19
Perpetrator: Abu Nidal Organization

1988
Pan Am Flight 103
Location: Lockerbie, Scotland
Killed: 270
Perpetrator: Iran

1990
1990 massacre of Sri Lankan Police officers
Location: Eastern Province, Sri Lanka
Killed: 600–740
Perpetrator: Liberation Tigers of Tamil Eelam

1992
1992 attack on Israeli embassy in Buenos Aires
Location: Buenos Aires, Argentina
Killed: 30 (including 1 suicide bomber)

1993
1993 World Trade Center bombing
Location: One World Trade Center (North Tower), Lower Manhattan, New York City, U.S.
Killed: 6 (1042 injured)
Perpetrator: Ramzi Yousef, Eyad Ismoil

1993 Bombay bombings
Location: Bombay Stock Exchange, Zhaveri Bazar, Shiv Sena Bhava
Killed: 250+ ( injured 1000+)
Perpetrator: D-Company

Greysteel massacre
Location: Greysteel, County Londonderry, Northern Ireland
Killed: 8 (19 wounded)
perpetrator: Ulster Defence Association (UDA)/Ulster Freedom Fighters (UFF)

1994
AMIA bombing
Location: Buenos Aires, Argentina
Killed: 86 (including 1 suicide bomber)

Loughinisland Massacre
Location: Loughinisland, Northern Ireland
Killed: 6 (5 injured)
Perpetrator: Ulster Volunteer Force (UVF)

1995
Tokyo subway sarin attack 
Location: Tokyo, Japan
Killed: 13 (injuries estimated to be in between 1,000 and 6,000)
Perpetrators: Aum Shinrikyo (Ikuo Hayashi, Kenichi Hirose Toru Toyoda, Masato Yakayama and Yasuo Hayashi)

Oklahoma City bombing
Location: United States
Killed: 168
Perpetrators: Timothy McVeigh and Terry Nichols

1995 France bombings
Location: Paris, France
Killed: 8 (190 injured)
Perpetrators:  Armed Islamic Group of Algeria

1998
US Embassy Bombings
Location: Kenya, Tanzania
Killed: 224 (4000+ injured)
Perpetrators: Al-Qaeda

Omagh bombing
Location: Omagh, Northern Ireland
Killed: 29 (220+ injured)
Perpetrators: Real Irish Republican Army (RIRA)

1999
Russian apartment bombings
Location: Russia
Killed: 307
Perpetrators:
Ibn Al-Khattab, Achemez Gochiyayev and accomplices, according to rulings by Russian courts
Federal Security Service and GRU, according to David Satter, Alexander Litvinenko, Yuri Felshtinsky and some other researchers

2000 to 2014

2000
Rizal Day bombings

Deaths: 22
 Location: Manila, Philippines
 Perpetrator: Jemaah Islamiyah and Abu Sayyaf

2001
September 11 attacks
 Deaths: 2,996 (2,977 + 19 hijackers. 2595 people from the World Trade Center towers, 125 people from the Pentagon, and 256 people from the planes)
 Location: United States
 Perpetrator: Al-Qaeda
American Airlines Flight 11 crashes into One World Trade Center (North Tower) at 8:46 AM EDT.
United Airlines Flight 175 crashes into Two World Trade Center (South Tower) at 9:03 AM EDT.
Killing 2,505 people at the Twin Towers of the World Trade Center, It is the deadliest terror attack in history.

2001 Indian Parliament attack

 Deaths: 9 (excluding 5 terrorists)
 Location: India
 Perpetrators: Lashkar-e-Taiba, Jaish-e-Mohammed

2002
2002 Bali bombings
 Deaths: 204 (202 + 2 suicide bombers)
 Location: Indonesia
 Perpetrator: Jemaah Islamiyah and al-Qaeda

Moscow theater hostage crisis
 Deaths: 130
 Location: Russia
 Perpetrator: Special Purpose Islamic Regiment

2004
Beslan school siege
 Deaths: 334
 Location: Russia
 Perpetrator: Riyad-us Saliheen Brigade of Martyrs

2004 Madrid train bombings
 Deaths: 191
 Location: Spain
 Perpetrator: al-Qaeda
2004 SuperFerry 14 bombing

 Deaths: 116
 Location: Philippines
 Perpetrator: Abu Sayyaf

2005
7/7 bombings, London
Deaths: 56
Location: London, England
Perpetrator: al-Qaeda

2005 Sharm El Sheikh bombings
Deaths: 88
Location: Sharm El Sheikh, Sinai, Egypt
Perpetrator: al-Qaeda

2007
2007 Yazidi communities bombings
 Deaths: 796
 Location: Iraq
 Perpetrator: Unknown

2008
2008 Christmas massacres
 Deaths: 620+
 Location: Democratic Republic of the Congo
 Perpetrator: Lord's Resistance Army

2008 Mumbai attacks
 Deaths: 166
 Location: India, Bombay (present day mumbai)
 Perpetrator: Lashkar-e-Taiba

2011 
2011 Norway attacks
 Deaths:  77 (319+ injured)
 Location: Oslo, Norway & Utøya, Norway
 Perpetrator: Anders Behring Breivik

2013

2013 Boston Marathon Bombings
 Deaths: 3 (264 injured)
 Location: Boston, Massachusetts
 Perpetrators: Dzhokhar A. Tsarnaev and Tamerlan Tsarnaev (brothers)

Westgate shopping mall attack

 Deaths: 71 (175 injured)
 Location: Nairobi, Kenya
 Perpetrators: Al-Shabaab terrorists

2014 
Camp Speicher massacre

 Deaths: 1,095
 Location: Iraq
 Perpetrator: Islamic State of Iraq and the Levant 
2014 Gamboru Ngala massacre
 Deaths: 300
 Location: Nigeria
 Perpetrator: Boko Haram
2014 Peshawar school massacre
Deaths: 144
 Location: Pakistan
 Perpetrator: Taliban

2015

2016

2017

2018

2019

2020

2021

2022

2023

Other attacks

This is a list of terrorist incidents with at least 100 fatalities, that are not included in the chronological timeline.

See also 
List of battles and other violent events by death toll
List of terrorist incidents

References

Terrorist